The Ministry of Local Development is the Egyptian government body responsible for local development. It is currently headed by Mahmoud Youssry Shaarawy.

The ministry was established by the decision of the President of Egypt with decree No. 325 of 1999. One of its objectives is to coordinate various efforts for the development of local communities and administration units in partnership with the governorates of Egypt.

Initiatives
The ministry's goals are to decentralize power and to provide employment for youth and women especially.

Their projects include decreasing illiteracy in Egypt, improving public services, generating more civic engagement, preparing local leaders, and in unison with other ministries, providing the land for the building of new housing units.

In 2018, the ministry requested that restrictions on Tuk Tuk licensing be lifted in order to ease congestion in cities.

See also

 Cabinet of Egypt

References

External links
 Egypt's Cabinet Database
 Ministry of Local Development Official Site in English 

Government ministries of Egypt